Alexandre Sarnes Negrão (born October 14, 1985), better known as Xande Negrão and nicknamed Xandinho, is a Brazilian entrepreneur and race car driver. He raced in the first three seasons of the GP2 Series, all with the Piquet Sports team, having won the Formula Three Sudamericana championship in 2004.

Career
Negrão's career started in karting in 1998, where he continued to race until he joined the Piquet team in Formula Three Sudamericana for the 2003 season. The team had been put together primarily to help Nelson Piquet Jr.'s run through the lower series, his goal to make Formula One, but nevertheless Negrão would stay with team in 2004. He ended the 2004 season as the champion, and also got a taste of British Formula Three that year, in the form of two races for the Carlin Motorsport team.

Negrão moved up to the GP2 Series for its inaugural season in 2005, alongside Piquet in his family-sponsored team. He scored only four points, but improved to thirteen in 2006, as Piquet unsuccessfully fought with Lewis Hamilton for the championship. Piquet moved to the Renault F1 team in for 2007 as the outfit's test driver, so Negrão was expected to lead his former GP2 team. However, Negrão had a very disappointing season, scoring fewer points than the previous year and being outscored by his rookie teammate Roldán Rodríguez. He was not retained for 2008. At the time of his departure from GP2, he was the only driver to have entered every GP2 race thus contested. He also held the record for most GP2 starts, which has subsequently been surpassed by Giorgio Pantano.

Negrão competed in four races for A1 Team Brazil in the 2007–08 A1 Grand Prix season, and is now concentrating on sports car racing for 2008. He is driving for the Vitaphone Racing Team in the FIA GT Championship, and has also participated in the 2008 Le Mans 24 Hours race.

Personal life
Xander was married to Brazilian actress Marina Ruy Barbosa between October 2017 and January 2021, when the couple filed for divorce.

Racing record

Career summary

Complete GP2 Series results
(key) (Races in bold indicate pole position) (Races in italics indicate fastest lap)

24 Hours of Le Mans results

Complete Stock Car Brasil results
(key) (Races in bold indicate pole position) (Races in italics indicate fastest lap)

References

  Retrieved on July 10, 2008.

External links
 

1985 births
Living people
A1 Team Brazil drivers
GP2 Series drivers
Brazilian GP2 Series drivers
British Formula Three Championship drivers
Formula 3 Sudamericana drivers
FIA GT Championship drivers
24 Hours of Le Mans drivers
European Le Mans Series drivers
FIA GT1 World Championship drivers
Stock Car Brasil drivers
24 Hours of Daytona drivers
Rolex Sports Car Series drivers
Brazilian WeatherTech SportsCar Championship drivers
24 Hours of Spa drivers
Carlin racing drivers
Piquet GP drivers
Hitech Grand Prix drivers
Strakka Racing drivers
AF Corse drivers
FIA World Endurance Championship drivers